Dzhokhar may refer to:

 Dzhokhar (name)
 Grozny, formerly (1998-2000) called Dƶoxar by the Chechen Republic of Ichkeria